Greece competed at the 2020 Summer Olympics in Tokyo. Originally scheduled to take place from 24 July to 9 August 2020, the Games were postponed to 23 July to 8 August 2021, because of the COVID-19 pandemic. Greek athletes have competed in every Summer Olympic Games of the modern era, alongside Australia, France, Great Britain, and Switzerland. As the progenitor nation of the Olympic Games and in keeping with tradition, Greece entered first at the New National Stadium during the parade of nations at the opening ceremony.

Medalists

| width=78% align=left valign=top |

| width=22% align=left valign=top |

| width=15% align=left valign=top |

Competitors
The following is the list of number of competitors in the Games.

Archery

Greece has qualified one female archer, after Evangelia Psarra finished in the top 5 in the Final Qualification Tournament.

Artistic swimming

With a top 3 finish in the team event at FINA Artistic Swimming Olympic Games Qualification Tournament in Barcelona, Greece qualified for both events.

Athletics

Greek athletes further achieved the entry standards, either by qualifying time or by world ranking, in the following track and field events (up to a maximum of 3 athletes in each event):

Track & road events
Men

Women

Field events
Men

Women

Cycling

Road
Greece entered one rider to compete in the men's Olympic road race, by virtue of his top 50 national finish (for men) in the UCI World Ranking.

Track
Following the completion of the 2020 UCI Track Cycling World Championships, Greece entered one rider to compete in the men's omnium based on his final individual UCI Olympic rankings.

Omnium

Mountain bike
Greece qualified one mountain biker for the men's Olympic cross-country race, as a result of his nation's nineteenth-place finish in the UCI Olympic Ranking List of 16 May 2021.

Fencing

Greece entered one fencer into the Olympic competition. 2019 world bronze medalist Theodora Gkountoura claimed a spot in the women's sabre as one of the two highest-ranked fencers vying for qualification from Europe in the FIE Adjusted Official Rankings.

Gymnastics

Artistic
On 25 June 2021, Eleftherios Petrounias secured a position in men's rings at the 2020 Summer Olympics, by winning a gold medal with 15.500 points at the 2020–2021 FIG World Cup in Doha, Qatar.

Men

Judo

Alexios Ntanatsidis secured a position in his category by virtue of his world ranking. Elisavet Teltsidou secured a position in her category through a continental quota.

Rowing

Greece qualified three boats for each of the following rowing classes into the Olympic regatta. The women's coxless pair confirmed an Olympic place by finishing fifth in the B-final and secured the last of eleven berths available at the 2019 FISA World Championships in Ottensheim, Austria, while the men's single sculls rower added one boat for the Greek roster with a top finish at the 2021 European Continental Qualification Regatta in Varese, Italy. Another Greek rower scored a gold-medal triumph to book one of the remaining boats available in the women's single sculls at the 2021 FISA Final Qualification Regatta in Lucerne, Switzerland.

Qualification Legend: FA=Final A (medal); FB=Final B (non-medal); FC=Final C (non-medal); FD=Final D (non-medal); FE=Final E (non-medal); FF=Final F (non-medal); SA/B=Semifinals A/B; SC/D=Semifinals C/D; SE/F=Semifinals E/F; QF=Quarterfinals; R=Repechage

Sailing

Greek sailors qualified one boat in each of the following classes through the 2018 Sailing World Championships, the class-associated Worlds, and the continental regattas.

Men

Women

M = Medal race, EL = Eliminated – did not advance into the medal race, DNF= Did not finish the race, BFD = Black Flag Disqualification – False start, DSQ = Disqualification, UFD = "U" Flag Disqualification

Shooting

Greek shooters achieved quota places for the following events by virtue of their best finishes at the 2018 ISSF World Championships, the 2019 ISSF World Cup series, European Championships or Games, and European Qualifying Tournament, as long as they obtained a minimum qualifying score (MQS) by May 31, 2020.

Swimming

Greek swimmers further achieved qualifying standards in the following events (up to a maximum of 2 swimmers in each event at the Olympic Qualifying Time (OQT), and potentially 1 at the Olympic Selection Time (OST)):

Men

Women

Mixed

Table tennis

Greece entered one athlete into the table tennis competition at the Games. Panagiotis Gionis scored a third-stage semifinal triumph to book his fifth consecutive trip to the Games in the men's singles at the European Qualification Tournament in Odivelas, Portugal.

Taekwondo

Greece entered one athlete into the taekwondo competition at the Games for the first time since 2012. 2018 Youth Olympic bronze medalist Fani Tzeli secured a spot in the women's lightweight category (57 kg) with a top two finish at the 2021 European Qualification Tournament in Sofia, Bulgaria.

Tennis

Stefanos Tsitsipas and Maria Sakkari secured a position in the Men's and Women's Singles respectively by virtue of their world rankings on 14 June 2021. In addition, their combined ranking made them available to play together in the Mixed Doubles tournament.

Water polo

Summary

Men's tournament

Greece men's national water polo team qualified for the Olympics by advancing to the final match of the 2020 World Qualification Tournament in Rotterdam, Netherlands.

Team roster

Group play

Quarterfinal

Semifinal

Gold medal game

Weightlifting

Greece has received a letter from IWF to fill a vacancy sending a male weightlifter to the Olympics.

Wrestling

Greece qualified two wrestlers for each of the following classes into the Olympic competition. One of them finished among the top six to claim an Olympic slot in the women's freestyle 53 kg at the 2019 World Championships, while an additional license was awarded to the Greek wrestler, who progressed to the top two finals of the men's freestyle 65 kg at the 2021 World Qualification Tournament in Sofia, Bulgaria.

Freestyle

Notes and references

Nations at the 2020 Summer Olympics
2020
2021 in Greek sport